Somerville High School is a public high school located in Somerville, Texas (USA). It is the sole high school in the Somerville Independent School District and is classified as a 2A school by the UIL. In 2016, the school was rated "Improvement Required" by the Texas Education Agency.

Athletics
The Somerville Yeguas compete in the following sports:

Baseball
Basketball
Cross Country
Football
Golf
Softball
Tennis
Track and Field
Volleyball

References

External links
 Official website

Schools in Burleson County, Texas
Public high schools in Texas